Curi may refer to:

Places
 Quri (Quiquijana), a mountain in Peru
 Mount Curi in East Timor

People

 Humberto Curi (1905–1981), Argentine boxer
 Kriton Curi (1942–1996), Turkish engineer
 Leonidha Çuri (born 1951), Albanian football manager and former player
 Renato Curi (1953–1977), Italian footballer, died suddenly during a match
 Monique Curi (born 1969), Brazilian actress
 Katheryn Curi (born 1974), American racing cyclist

See also
 Cury (surname)
 Curry (disambiguation)
 Curie (disambiguation)
 Khouri or Khoury, an Arabic surname, of which Curi is a written form.